Diatrypella is a genus of fungi in the family Diatrypaceae. The genus has a widespread distribution and contains 33 species.

References

Xylariales
Taxa named by Giuseppe De Notaris